Sport Football Club Hapoel Kiryat Yam, or simply Hapoel Kiryat Yam, is an Israeli football club based in Kiryat Yam. The club is currently in Liga Gimel Samaria division.

History
A previous club named Hapoel Kiryat Yam was founded in 1964, and in its prime, played thirteen seasons in Liga Bet, then the third tier of Israeli football (the fourth tier since 1976), from the 1968–69 season to the 1980–81 season, in which the club was relegated to Liga Gimel.

Another club, named Sport Club Kiryat Yam, or simply F.C. Kiryat Yam, was founded in 2008 and was in existence for only three seasons, until the end of the 2010–11 season, while playing in Liga Gimel.

The current club was founded at the summer of 2014 as Sport Club Kiryat Yam, and registered at the Israel Football Association for the 2014–15 season in Liga Gimel as Sport Football Club Hapoel Kiryat Yam.

Honours

League

1Achieved by Hapoel Kiryat Yam F.C.

External links
Sport Football Club Hapoel Kiryat Yam  The Israel Football Association

References

Kiryat Yam
Kiryat Yam
Association football clubs established in 1949
1949 establishments in Israel